The Asiatic–Pacific Campaign Medal is a United States military award of the Second World War, which was awarded to any member of the United States Armed Forces who served in the Asiatic-Pacific Theater from 1941 to 1945. The medal was created on November 6, 1942, by  issued by President Franklin D. Roosevelt. The medal was designed by Thomas Hudson Jones; the reverse side was designed by Adolph Alexander Weinman which is the same design as used on the reverse of the American Campaign Medal and European-African-Middle Eastern Campaign Medal.

There were 21 Army and 48 Navy-Marine Corps official campaigns of the Pacific Theater, denoted on the suspension and service ribbon of the medal by service stars which also were called "battle stars"; some Navy construction battalion units issued the medal with Arabic numerals.  The Arrowhead device is authorized for those campaigns which involved participation in amphibious assault landings. The Fleet Marine Force Combat Operation Insignia is also authorized for wear on the medal for Navy service members who participated in combat while assigned to a Marine Corps unit. The flag colors of the United States and Japan are visible in the ribbon.

The Asiatic–Pacific Campaign Medal was first issued as a service ribbon in 1942. A full medal was authorized in 1947, the first of which was presented to General of the Army Douglas MacArthur.  The European Theater equivalent of the medal was known as the European-African-Middle Eastern Campaign Medal.

Boundaries of Asiatic-Pacific Theater.
(1) The eastern boundary is coincident with the western boundary of the American Theater.
(2) The western boundary is from the North Pole south along the 60th meridian east longitude to its intersection with the east boundary of Iran, then south along the Iran boundary to the Gulf of Oman and the intersection of the 60th meridian east longitude, then south along the 60th meridian east longitude to the South Pole.

US Army campaigns 
The 16 officially recognized US Army campaigns in the Asiatic-Pacific Theater of Operations are:

 Pacific Ocean Areas Command:
 Central Pacific: 7 December 1941 – 6 December 1943, allied landings on Tarawa and Makin during the Gilbert and Marshall Islands campaign
 Air Offensive Japan: 17 April 1942 – 2 September 1945
 Aleutian Islands: 3 June 1942 – 24 August 1943, the Aleutian Islands campaign
 Northern Solomons: 22 February 1943 – 21 November 1944, part of the Solomon Islands campaign
 Eastern Mandates: 31 January - 14 June 1944, allied landings on Kwajalein and Eniwetok during the Gilbert and Marshall Islands campaign
 Western Pacific: 15 June 1944 – 2 September 1945, the Mariana and Palau Islands campaign
 Ryukyus: 26 March - 2 July 1945, the allied landings on Okinawa
 South West Pacific Areas Command:
 Philippine Islands: 7 December 1941 – 10 May 1942, the Japanese conquest Philippines
 East Indies: 1 January - 22 July 1942, Japanese conquest of the Dutch East Indies
 Papua: 23 July 1942 – 23 January 1943, part of the New Guinea campaign
 Guadalcanal: 7 August 1942 – 21 February 1943, the Guadalcanal campaign
 New Guinea: 24 January 1943 – 31 December 1944, the New Guinea campaign
 Bismarck Archipelago: 15 December 1943 – 27 November 1944
 Leyte: 17 October 1944 – 1 July 1945, allied landings and liberation of Leyte
 Luzon: 15 December 1944 – 4 July 1945, allied landings and liberation of Luzon
 Southern Philippines: 27 February - 4 July 1945, allied liberation of the Southern Philippines during the Philippines campaign

US Navy - Marine Corps campaigns
The 43 officially recognized US Navy campaigns in the Pacific Theater of Operations are:

 Pearl Harbor: Pearl Harbor-Midway: 7 December 1941
 Wake Island: 8–23 December 1941
 Philippine Islands operation: 8 December 1941 – 6 May 1942
 Netherlands East Indies engagements: 23 January – 27 February 1942
 Pacific raids (1942): 1 February – 10 March 1942
 Coral Sea: 4–8 May 1942
 Midway: 3–6 June 1942
 Guadalcanal-Tulagi landings: 7–9 August 1942 (First Savo)
 Capture and defense of Guadalcanal: 10 August 1942 – 8 February 1943
 Makin Raid: 17–18 August 1942
 Eastern Solomons: 23–25 August 1942
 Buin-Faisi-Tonolai raid: 5 October 1942
 Cape Esperance: 11–12 October 1942 (Second Savo)
 Santa Cruz Islands: 26 October 1942
 Guadalcanal: 12–15 November 1942 (Third Savo)
 Tassafaronga: 30 November – 1 December 1942 (Fourth Savo)
 Eastern New Guinea operation: 17 December 1942 – 24 July 1944
 Rennel Island: 29–30 January 1943
 Consolidation of Solomon Islands: 8 February 1943 – 15 March 1945
 Aleutians operation: 26 March – 2 June 1943
 New Georgia Group operation: 20 June – 16 October 1943
 Bismarck Archipelago operation: 25 June 1943 – 1 May 1944
 Pacific raids (1943): 31 August – 6 October 1943
 Treasury-Bougainville operation: 27 October – 15 December 1943
 Gilbert Islands operation: 13 November – 8 December 1943
 Marshall Islands operation: 26 November 1943 – 2 March 1944
 Asiatic-Pacific raids (1944): 16 February – 9 October 1944
 Western New Guinea operations: 21 April 1944 – 9 January 1945
 Marianas operation: 10 June – 27 August 1944
 Western Caroline Islands operation: 31 August – 14 October 1944
 Leyte operation: 10 October – 29 November 1944
 Luzon operation: 12 December 1944 – 1 April 1945
 Iwo Jima operation 15 February – 16 March 1945
 Okinawa Gunto operation: 17 March – 30 June 1945
 Third Fleet operations against Japan: 10 July – 15 August 1945
 Kurile Islands operation: 1 February 1944 – 11 August 1945
 Borneo operations: 27 April – 20 July 1945
 Tinian capture and occupation: 24 July – 1 August 1944
 Consolidation of the Southern Philippines: 28 February – 20 July 1945
 Hollandia operation: 21 April – 1 June 1944
 Manila Bay-Bicol operations: 29 January – 16 April 1945
 Escort, antisubmarine, armed guard and special operations: 7 December 1941 – 2 September 1945
 Submarine War Patrols (Pacific): 7 December 1941 – 2 September 1945

Other campaigns
For members of the U.S. military who did not receive campaign credit, but still served on active duty in the Pacific Theater, the following “blanket” campaigns are authorized for which the Asiatic–Pacific Campaign Medal is awarded without service stars.

 Antisubmarine December 7, 1941 – September 2, 1945
 Ground Combat: December 7, 1941 – September 2, 1945
 Air Combat: December 7, 1941 – September 2, 1945

See also
Service Star
Arrowhead device
Awards and decorations of the United States military

References

External links

Asiatic-Pacific Campaign Medal - Criteria, Background, and Images
Navy Authorized Pacific Theater Engagements
US Army TACOM, Clothing and Insignia PSID, Asiatic-Pacific Campaign Medal

United States campaign medals
Works by Adolph Weinman
Military awards and decorations of World War II
Awards disestablished in 1946
Awards established in 1942
Pacific theatre of World War II